Yamaho Yama ( Oh Yama, It's Yama) is a 2012 Telugu language fantasy comedy film starring Sairam Shankar, Parvati Melton, Srihari and Sanjjanaa and directed by Jithender Yadagiri. The movie is dubbed in Hindi as Qatilon Ka Qatil.

Plot
Balu (Sairam Shankar) is a young lad who is fated to die at the age of 25, as per his horoscope. In order to prevent this, his grandmother (Rama Prabha) makes him a devotee of Lord Yama (Srihari) in order to avert this. As Balu approaches the age of 25 years, Ram Prabha decides to send the young lad to USA. Balu roams around without any responsibilities and ends up as a good for nothing lad.
In order to mend Balu's ways, none other than Lord Yama enters the fray. He decides to travel to the US and help out the kid. But even the great Yama fails to mend Balu and that is when he realises that Balu needs to fall in love to become a better person.
He makes Balu fall in love with Swapna (Parvati Melton) and the rest of the movie is about how Balu becomes a better person.

Cast
 Sairam Shankar as Balu
 Parvati Melton as Swapna
 Srihari as Yama
 Sithara as Yama's wife
 Ali
 Sanjjanaa Galrani as Nisha
 M. S. Narayana as Chitragupta
 Rama Prabha as Balu's grandmother
 Kovai Sarala
 Thagubothu Ramesh

References

External links
 

2012 films
2010s Telugu-language films
Indian fantasy comedy films
2010s fantasy comedy films
2012 comedy films
Yama in popular culture